The 1986 Central Michigan Chippewas football team represented Central Michigan University in the Mid-American Conference (MAC) during the 1986 NCAA Division I-A football season. In their ninth season under head coach Herb Deromedi, the Chippewas compiled a 5–5 record (4–4 against MAC opponents), finished in a tie for fifth place in the MAC standings, and were outscored by their opponents, 284 to 258. The team played its home games in Kelly/Shorts Stadium in Mount Pleasant, Michigan, with attendance of 118,457 in five home games.

The team's statistical leaders included quarterback Marcelle Carruthers with 912 passing yards, Rodney Stevenson with 1,104 rushing yards, and Melvin Houston with 210 receiving yards. Offensive guard Rick Poljan received the team's most valuable player award. Three Central Michigan players (offensive tackle Brian Williams, offensive guard Rick Poljan, and running back Rodney Stevenson) received first-team All-MAC honors.

Schedule

References

Central Michigan
Central Michigan Chippewas football seasons
Central Michigan Chippewas football